Barney Greengrass is a restaurant, deli, and appetizing store at 541 Amsterdam Avenue (between West 86th and 87th Streets) on the Upper West Side of Manhattan, New York City, started in 1908. They specialize in smoked fish, more specifically sturgeon, but also have Nova Scotia salmon, whitefish, and others, and are very popular for brunch.

They were the winner of the 2006 James Beard Foundation Award for Excellence.  In 2013, Zagat gave it a food rating of 24, third-highest among New York City delis. In 2021, the Financial Times ranked it as one of the “50 greatest food stores in the world.”

History
Barney Greengrass originally opened in 1908 at the corner of West 113th Street and St. Nicholas Avenue in Harlem. It moved to its current location, at 86th Street and Amsterdam Avenue in 1929. In 1938 he was given the nickname "Sturgeon King"  by James J. Frawley.

After the death of Barney Greengrass, the restaurant was run by his son Marvin (always called "Moe") and his wife Shirley. After Moe's death in 2001, his son Gary Greengrass took over management responsibility.

Beverly Hills
In 1995, Barney Greengrass opened an outlet at the Beverly Hills branch of Barneys New York.

See also
 List of delicatessens
 List of James Beard America's Classics

References

External links
 

1908 establishments in New York (state)
Appetizing stores
Jewish delicatessens in the United States
Jews and Judaism in Manhattan
Restaurants established in 1908
Restaurants in Manhattan
Upper West Side
James Beard Foundation Award winners